Northwest Bank is a bank headquartered in Warren, PA. It is the leading subsidiary of Northwest Bancshares, Inc., a bank holding company. It operates 170 branches in central and western Pennsylvania, western New York, eastern Ohio, and Indiana.

History
The bank was founded in 1896 in Bradford, Pennsylvania. At that time, the bank was known as Northwest Mutual Savings Association. 

In 1974, the bank moved its headquarters to Warren, Pennsylvania.

In more recent times, while still known as Northwest Mutual Savings Association, the bank acquired a number of other financial institutions including: Ridgway Federal Savings and Loan Association in 1983; Mutual Savings and Loan Association in 1984; Bakerstown Savings and Loan Association in 1985; Horizon Savings Association in 1990; Steitz Savings and Loan Association in 1990; American Federal Saving in 1992; First Federal Savings Bank of Kane in 1996; The First National Bank of Centre Hall in 1996; Bridgeville Savings Bank in 1997; and Corry Savings Bank in 1998. In 1985, the bank acquired four southwestern Pennsylvania branches from Equimark subsidiary Pittsburgh-based Equibank.

In 1993, the bank changed its name for the first time when it became Northwest Savings Bank. It also changed its regulatory agency to the FDIC and became a mutual savings bank.

On December 18, 2009, the bank converted from a mutual savings bank to a joint stock company.

In 2015, the bank changed its name to the present Northwest Bank.

In August 2015, the bank's holding company, Northwest Bancshares, Inc., merged with LNB Bancorp, Inc., in a stock and cash deal and acquired Lorain National Bank. The transaction value was approximately $179 million, and resulted in a bank with approximately $9.0 billion in total assets.

In March 2016, Northwest Bank acquired Best Insurance Agency, Inc.

On September 9, 2016, the bank acquired 18 branches in western New York from First Niagara Bank, which was about to be acquired by KeyBank. These branches were once part of the former Marine Midland Bank.

In May 2017, Northwest Bank exited the Maryland market by selling all 3 remaining branch locations to locally-based Shore United Bank. In 2017, the bank’s assets were valued at $9.5 billion and the bank was ranked number 134 in the whole country.

In April 2020, the bank acquired MutualFirst Financial, a Muncie, Indiana-based bank, in a stock and cash deal valued at $346 million. The transaction expanded Northwest's footprint into the Indiana market, and gave the bank a total of 221 branches across four states.

Following that acquisition, Northwest Bank enacted a 'branch optimization plan', closing 40 branches spread across its multi-state footprint.  In 2020, the bank's assets were valued at $13.8 billion.

In February 2021, the bank officially moved the headquarters for its holding company from Warren, PA to Columbus, Ohio, relocating several key executives including CEO Ron Seiffert.

In April 2021, Northwest announced the sale of its insurance services business to USI Insurance Services, based in Valhalla, New York.

References

Banks based in Ohio
1896 establishments in Pennsylvania
Banks established in 1896
Companies listed on the Nasdaq